"Drum Boogie" is a 1941 jazz "boogie-woogie" standard, composed by Gene Krupa and  trumpeter Roy Eldridge and originally sung by Irene Daye, soon replaced by Anita O'Day.

Movie appearance
It was first recorded on January 17, 1941 in Chicago and was also featured in a film that year, Ball of Fire, performed by Krupa and his band in an extended version, when it was sung by Barbara Stanwyck, whose singing was dubbed by Martha Tilton.

Other versions
In 1942, Ella Fitzgerald sang the song on tour with the Gene Krupa Orchestra. In 1953, Gene Krupa played the song at the US-operated Ernie Pyle Theatre in Tokyo, which "brought the house down" according to The Pittsburgh Courier.

Analysis
David Dicaire referred to the song as "Krupa's best drum solo, an accumulation of twenty years of studying the intricacies of rhythmic textures". It is an E flat blues boogie-woogie progression with lyrics such as "Boogie! You hear the rhythm rompin'! Boogie! You see the drummer stompin'!  It really is a killer!". In 1971 The Danville Register cited it as one of "50 Great Songs" of the Swinging 40's.

References

1940s jazz standards
Jazz compositions in E-flat major
1941 songs
Songs about jazz
Songs about drums